Stories To Tell is an acoustic album released by Richard Marx  featuring several songs from his previous albums in newly recorded acoustic versions. It is his second album of acoustic reworkings of his previous hits, with the Richard Marx/Matt Scannell album Duo being the first. The 11 track collection was first released in March 2010 and available for purchase exclusively at his solo acoustic concerts. The album was later repackaged and released November 11, 2010 in Europe with an additional 7 bonus tracks featuring songs Marx had written or co-written for other artists such as Keith Urban, NSYNC, and Daughtry, all performed here by Marx. May 3, 2011, the album was again repackaged into a three disc set for an exclusive Wal-Mart stores release. The first disc featured the original 11 songs from the first release of Stories To Tell - along with an acoustic version of Marx's new song "When You Loved Me".  The second disc features re-imagined recordings of 11 of Marx's hits plus the studio version of "When You Loved Me."  The third disc is a DVD of Marx's concert at Shepherd's Bush in London, England.

Track listing
All songs written by Richard Marx, except where noted.
Standard U.S. Edition
Endless Summer Nights - 4:35
One Thing Left - 3:57
Hazard - 4:17
Over My Head - 3:39
Angelia - 4:39
Now And Forever - 3:59
Keep Coming Back - 5:47
This I Promise You - 4:07
Loved - 4:21
Should've Known Better - 3:18
Right Here Waiting - 4:49

 European edition bonus tracks
This I Promise You - 4:40
Had Enough (Marx, Daughtry, Wade) - 3:48
To Where You Are (Marx, Linda Thompson) - 3:34
On The Inside (Marx, Daughtry, Kroeger) - 3:16
Never Take Me Dancing - 5:15
The Best Of Me (Marx, Foster, Lubbock) - 4:30
Everybody (Marx, Urban) - 5:15

 Wal-Mart Exclusive
Disc 1: Stories To Tell
Endless Summer Nights
One Thing Left
Hazard
Over My Head
Angelia
Now And Forever
Keep Coming Back
This I Promise You
Loved
Should've Known Better
Right Here Waiting
When You Loved Me

Disc 2: The Best Of Richard Marx
Don't Mean Nothing
Should've Known Better
Endless Summer Nights
Keep Coming Back
Take This Heart
Hold On To The Nights
Angelia
Hazard
Too Late To Say Goodbye
Satisfied
Right Here Waiting
When You Loved Me

Disc 3 (DVD): Live At Shepherd's Bush
Endless Summer Nights
Take This Heart
One Thing Left
When You're Gone
Hazard
Through My Veins
Always On Your Mind
Angelia
Everybody
Should've Known Better
Don't Mean Nothing
Right Here Waiting

Chart performance

Album Credits

Personnel
Jo Allen - strings
Steve Brewster - drums
Paul Bushnell - bass guitar
Joanne Davies - background vocals
Jim Gailloreto - saxophone
Bruce Gaitsch - writer, guitars, nylon guitar
Mark Hill - bass guitar
Steve Hornbeak - piano, harmony vocals
John Howard - bass guitar
Michael Landau - guitars
Herman Matthews - drums
Jerry McPherson - guitars
Kevin Marks - guitars
Jesse Marx - harmony vocals
Lucas Marx - harmony vocals
Richard Marx - producer, writer, arrangements, lead & background vocals, acoustic guitar, guitars, keyboards
Emma Owens - strings
Rhian Porter - strings
Matt Scannell - writer, guitars
Chuck Tilley - drums
Keith Urban - writer
Fee Waybill - writer
Jason Webb - piano, keyboards

Engineers
Chip Matthews
Joel Numa
Bill Philput
Matthew Prock
Jamie Sickora

Guest Credits
Matt Scannell

Miscellaneous
This is Marx's first solo acoustic album.
The track "Loved" features new lyrics not present on the Sundown album version of the same track.
This is Marx's first album to have three separate releases, each at different times, each with a different album cover.
The new song, "When You Loved Me", became Marx's first Top 20 hit on Billboard's Adult Contemporary chart in over 13 years.

2010 albums
Richard Marx albums
Albums produced by Richard Marx
Self-released albums